Amanda Anisimova defeated Aliaksandra Sasnovich in the final, 7–5, 1–6, 6–4 to win the singles title at the 2022 Melbourne Summer Set 2.

This was the first edition of the tournament.

Seeds

Draw

Finals

Top half

Bottom half

Qualifying

Seeds

Qualifiers

Lucky loser

Qualifying draw

First qualifier

Second qualifier

Third qualifier

Fourth qualifier

Fifth qualifier

Sixth qualifier

See also 
 2022 Melbourne Summer Set 1 – Women's singles

References

External links 
 
 WTA tournament Official website

Melbourne Summer Set 2 – Singles